Mohd. Khairuddin bin Othman is a Malaysian politician and currently serves as Selangor State Executive Councillor.

Election results

References 

Living people
People from Selangor
Malaysian people of Malay descent
People's Justice Party (Malaysia) politicians
Former Malaysian Islamic Party politicians
21st-century Malaysian politicians
Year of birth missing (living people)
Members of the Selangor State Legislative Assembly
 Selangor state executive councillors